Darlington Football Club, an English association football club based in Darlington, County Durham, was founded in 1883. They entered the FA Cup for the first time in 1885–86, were founder members of the Northern League in 1889, turned professional in 1908 and joined the North Eastern League, which they won in 1913 and 1921. The latter win preceded election to the Football League as members of its newly formed Third Division North. Runners-up in their first season, Darlington were Northern Section champions three years later, thus winning promotion to the Second Division. Their 15th-place finish in 1926 remains their best League performance, and they were relegated back to the Third Division the following year. After 68 years of continuous membership, they were relegated from the Football League in 1988–89. Having made an immediate return as Conference champions, they remained in the League until 2010, when they again dropped into the Conference. After Darlington failed to exit administration in a manner acceptable to the Football Association, that body treated it as a new club, required it to change its name (to Darlington 1883), and placed its team in the Northern League, the ninth tier of English football, for the 2012–13 season. Five years later, the FA approved the club's request to resume its traditional name.

The club's first team have competed in numerous nationally organised competitions, and all players who have played in between 25 and 99 such matches, either as a member of the starting eleven or as a substitute, are listed below. Each player's details include the duration of his Darlington career, his typical playing position while with the club, and the number of games played and goals scored in domestic league matches and in all senior competitive matches. Where applicable, the list also includes the national team for which the player was selected, and the number of senior international caps he won.

Introduction 

Of the more than 350 men who made 25 career appearances for Darlington in national competitions but fell short of the 100 mark, several hold club records. Jason de Vos was the first to play senior international football while a Darlington player, and Franz Burgmeier made most senior international appearances, with seven for Liechtenstein during the 2008–09 season. At 15 years 318 days, Curtis Main became Darlington's youngest Football League debutant when he entered the League Two visit to Peterborough United on 3 May 2008 as a second-half substitute. The sale of de Vos to Dundee United for £400,000 in 1998 generated the club's record transfer fee received, and the record for fee paid, of £100,000, was set in 2006 when Julian Joachim was signed from Boston United and equalled the following year with the purchase of Pawel Abbott from Swansea City.

Others made an important contribution to the club despite relatively few appearances in national competition. Dick Healey's career was coming to an end by the time the club was elected to the Football League, but he was their top scorer with 41 goals as they won the North-Eastern League title in 1913 and captained the club to their second title in 1921, as well as scoring four goals in as many matches for the England amateur team and representing the Amateur XI in the 1913 FA Charity Shield. Dick Jackson played in 26 FA Cup matches while player-manager of Darlington either side of the First World War, and George Browna former England international and three-time League winner with Huddersfield Townhad a spell as player-manager in the 1930s. Lol Morgan, Mick Tait and Martin Gray went on to manage the club: Morgan managed the team to promotion from the Fourth Division in 1965–66, and Gray led the team to three promotions in four seasons after taking over as manager in 2012. Marco Gabbiadini was the only player with fewer than 100 League appearances to be voted by supporters into a "Dream Team" as part of the 2003 Farewell to Feethams celebrations (when the club left their long-time home).

Other players took part in significant matches in the history of the club. Tommy Barbour, Percy Sutcliffe, Alf Dolphin and Arthur Wolstenholme played in Darlington's first match in the Football League, a 2–0 win at home to Halifax Town on 27 August 1921. Tommy Moran scored twice and created two other goals, one for Ron Harbertson, as Darlington eliminated Chelsea, League champions only three seasons earlier, in the fourth round of the 1957–58 FA Cup to progress to the last 16 of the competition for only the second time in their history. Gary Coatsworth scored the goal that confirmed Darlington as winners of the 1989–90 Football Conference title. John McReady, Gary Smith and Michael Smith played in Darlington's last match in the Football League, against Dagenham & Redbridge on 8 May 2010. After Tommy Wright struck the bar in the 120th minute of the 2011 FA Trophy Final, substitute Chris Senior was first to the rebound to head Darlington's winning goal. Jamie Chandler was man of the match, and the team included seven other men listed here.

Still others earned their notability elsewhere. In Jack Beby's time as manager of AEKthe club's website dubs him the "great reformer"he led the team to successive victories in the Greek Cup in 1949 and 1950. Tom Burlison was an active trade unionist who became deputy general secretary of the GMB, treasurer of the Labour Party and, as Baron Burlison of Rowlands Gill, was the first former professional footballer to enter the House of Lords, where he was a Government whip.

Key

The list is ordered first by number of appearances in total, then by number of League appearances, and then if necessary by date of debut.
Appearances as a substitute are included.
Statistics are correct up to and including 1 July 2022, the first match of Darlington's 2022–23 season. Where a player left the club permanently after this date, his statistics are updated to his date of leaving.

Players with 25 to 99 appearances

Players with fewer than 25 or 100 or more appearances

Footnotes

Player statistics include games played while on loan from:

References
Appearances and goals

Specific

Sources
 
 
 

Players
 
Darlington
Players
Association football player non-biographical articles